Werner Marcks (17 July 1896 – 28 July 1967) was a German general in the Wehrmacht during World War II who commanded several armoured divisions. He was a recipient of the Knight's Cross of the Iron Cross with Oak Leaves.

Awards and decorations
 Iron Cross (1914) 2nd Class (28 May 1915) & 1st Class (22 February 1918)
 Clasp to the Iron Cross (1939) 2nd Class (14 September 1939) & 1st Class (16 October 1939)
 German Cross in Gold on 11 December 1941 as Oberstleutnant in the I./Schützen-Regiment 64
 Knight's Cross of the Iron Cross with Oak Leaves
 Knight's Cross on 2 February 1942 as Oberstleutnant and commander of Kampfgruppe Marcks
 593rd Oak Leaves on 21 September 1944 as Generalmajor and commander of 1. Panzer Division
 Medaglia d'Argento al Valore Militare

References

Citations

Bibliography

1896 births
1967 deaths
German Army personnel of World War I
Lieutenant generals of the German Army (Wehrmacht)
Military personnel from Magdeburg
People from the Province of Saxony
Recipients of the clasp to the Iron Cross, 1st class
Recipients of the Gold German Cross
Recipients of the Knight's Cross of the Iron Cross with Oak Leaves
Recipients of the Silver Medal of Military Valor
German Army generals of World War II